Keishamthong (Vidhan Sabha constituency) is one of the 60 assembly constituencies of Manipur a north east state of India.

Members of Legislative Assembly

Election results

2022

2017

2012

See also
 List of constituencies of Manipur Legislative Assembly
 Imphal West district

References

External link
 

Assembly constituencies of Manipur
Imphal West district